The Boston Senior Football Championship is an annual Gaelic football competition, played in the Boston region of America. The competition is organised by the Northeast Division Board of the Gaelic Athletic Association. The games are played at the Irish Cultural Center, in Canton, Massachusetts. The final is usually held the weekend prior to Labor Day. The winners and the runners-up will represent Boston in the North American Senior Football Championship.

Roll of honour

 1999 Kerry won on objection. Shannon Blues won final, but were disqualified for fielding illegal players.

1928 establishments in Massachusetts
Canton, Massachusetts
Gaelic football competitions in the United States
Gaelic football in Massachusetts
Sports competitions in Massachusetts
Recurring sporting events established in 1928
Sports in Norfolk County, Massachusetts